The 1st NBC Battalion "Etruria" is an inactive unit of the Italian Army last based in Rieti. Throughout the Cold War the battalion was the army's only NBC defense unit. Formed in 1976 the battalion received the flag and traditions of the Chemical Regiment, which had been formed in 1936 and served in World War II.

History 
On 1 July 1923 the Royal Italian Army constituted the Chemical Service, which began to experiment with chemical warfare agents and means of delivery. By 1934 the Chemical Service had grown to two battalions. The same year chemical companies and flamethrower platoons were formed for each army corps, and a chemical unit was formed in Rome. During the 1935-36 Second Italo-Ethiopian War Italy repeatedly used chemical weapons against Ethiopian troops and civilians, which were exclusively deployed by the Royal Italian Air Force. Do expedite the army's capabilities to deploy chemical weapons the Chemical Regiment was formed in Rome on 1 January 1936, by reorganizing the Chemical Unit formed earlier.

The regiment consisted of a command, a depot, the I Battalion with three chemical companies, and the II School Battalion with a chemical company, a Model 35 flamethrower company and a Model 35 mortar company. On 21 October 1938 the regiment received its flag. In April 1940 the regiment changed composition and now consisted of a command, a depot, the I School Battalion, the II Mortar Battalion, the III Chemical Battalion, the IV Mixed Battalion with a two flamethrower companies and a nebulizers company. Chemical units were tasked with ensuring that troops and units were trained and prepared for chemical defense, as well as tasked to employ chemical weapons if so ordered by the army general staff.

World War II 
After the outbreak of World War II the regiment's depot began to mobilize new units:

 II Flamethrower Battalion
 CI, CII, CIII, and CIV mortar battalions
 numerous chemical, fog generators, and flamethrower companies

By 6 November 1940 the Chemical Service consisted of:

 Chemical Regiment
 10th Mixed Chemical Grouping (for the Army General Staff), with a command, a nebulizers battalion, a flamethrower battalion, and two mortar battalions 
 a chemical grouping for each army, with a command, a chemical battalion, and a mortar battalion 
 a mixed chemical battalion for the Army of the Po, with a command, a chemical company, and a mortar company 
 twenty chemical companies, one attached to each army corps
 two chemical platoons, one based on Elba and one in Zadar

On  1 January 1942 the Chemical Regiment was reorganized as follows:
 Chemical Regiment, in Rome
 Command, command company, and depot, in Rome
 I School Battalion, in Rome
 II Chemical Battalion, in Alatri
 III Flamethrower Battalion, in Sulmona
 IV Chemical Mortar Battalion, in Civitavecchia 

Throughout the war the Italian military did not use chemical weapons, and the chemical unit's mortars were employed with conventional munitions, while many of the smaller chemical units were employed as smoke and fog generating units. The Chemical Service and the Chemical Regiment were disbanded by invading German forces after the announcement of the Armistice of Cassibile on 8 September 1943.

Cold War 
In 1952 the Italian Army's Artillery Inspectorate formed a Chemical Defense Office tasked with providing the Italian military with nuclear, biological, and chemical defense. On 1 October 1961 the office was elevated to ABC Defense Inspectorate. In October 1957 the existing fog generators and flamethrowers company was reorganized as Experimental ABC Company and assigned to the ABC Defense Office. In 1964 office and company changed their names from ABC to NBC. On 1 March 1967 the company was expanded to NBC Defense Battalion. Based in Rieti the battalion consisted of a command, a command and services company, the 1st NBC Company (Experiments), and the 2nd NBC Company (Training). In 1969 the battalion added the 3rd NBC Company (Training).

During the 1975 army reform the Italian Army disbanded the regimental level and newly independent battalions were granted for the first time their own flags. On 15 September 1975 the battalion was reorganized and now consisted of a command, a command and services company, and two specialized NBC companies. On 1 February 1975 the battalion was renamed 1st NBC Battalion "Etruria" and assigned the flag and traditions of the Chemical Regiment. On the same day the NBC Defense Inspectorate was merged back into the Artillery Inspectorate, which was renamed Artillery and NBC-defense Inspectorate. The inspectorate contained an NBC Office that controlled the Etruria, which acted as the army's central training institution for all NBC defense personnel, which after training was assigned to operational units.

On 1 May 1994 the Italian military's Joint Forces Nuclear, Biological and Chemical Defence School moved to Rieti and merged with the 1st NBC Battalion "Etruria". In 1995 the Italian Army decided to unite its operational NBC Defense personnel in one unit and on 25 July 1996 Civitavecchia 7th Artillery Regiment "Cremona" was assigned to the Artillery Command and began to re-role as CBRN defense unit. On 31 December 1998 the regiment was renamed 7th CBRN Defense Regiment "Cremona".

References

Artillery Regiments of Italy